The 16th Chess Olympiad (Olimpiada ha-shachmat ha-16), organized by FIDE and comprising an open team tournament, as well as several other events designed to promote the game of chess, took place between November 2 and November 25, 1964, in Tel Aviv, Israel.

The Soviet team with 6 GMs, led by world champion Petrosian, lived up to expectations and won their seventh consecutive gold medals, with Yugoslavia and West Germany taking the silver and bronze, respectively.

Results

Preliminaries

A total of 50 teams entered the competition and were divided into seven preliminary groups of seven or eight teams each. With Australia making its debut, this was the first Olympiad where all six continents were represented. The top two from each group advanced to Final A, the teams placed 3rd-4th to Final B, no. 5–6 to Final C, and the rest to Final D. All preliminary groups and finals were played as round-robin tournaments. The preliminary results were as follows:

 Group 1: 

 Group 2: 

 Group 3: 

 Group 4: 

 Group 5: 

 Group 6: 

 Group 7:

Final

{| class="wikitable"
|+ Final A
! # !!Country !! Players !! Points !! MP !! Head-to-head
|-
| style="background:gold;"|1 ||  || Petrosian, Botvinnik, Smyslov, Keres, Stein, Spassky || 36½ ||  || 
|-
| style="background:silver;"|2 ||  || Gligorić, Ivkov, Matanović, Parma, Udovčić, Matulović || 32 ||  || 
|-
| style="background:#cc9966;"|3 ||  || Unzicker, Darga, Schmid, Pfleger, Mohrlok, Bialas || 30½ ||  || 
|-
| 4 ||  || Portisch, Szabó, Bilek, Lengyel, Forintos, Flesch || 30 ||  || 
|-
| 5 ||  || Pachman, Filip, Hort, Kaválek, Jansa, Blatný || 28½ ||  || 
|-
| 6 ||  || Reshevsky, Benko, Saidy, Bisguier, Byrne, Addison || 27½ ||  || 
|-
| 7 ||  || Padevsky, Tringov, Bobotsov, Popov, Milev, Spiridonov || 27 || 13 || 3
|-
| 8 ||  || Ghițescu, Gheorghiu, Ciocâltea, Radovici, Mititelu, Botez || 27 || 13 || 1
|-
| 9 ||  || Eliskases, García, Schweber, Wexler, Cruz || 26 ||  || 
|-
| 10 ||  || Doda, Bednarski, Śliwa, Filipowicz, Balcerowski, Schmidt || 24 ||  || 
|-
| 11 ||  || Kuijpers, Bouwmeester, Langeweg, Zuidema, Prins || 21 ||  || 
|-
| 12 ||   || Yanofsky, Anderson, Vranesic, Macskasy, Suttles, Witt || 19 ||  || 
|-
| 13 ||  || Pomar, Medina García, Saborido, Menvielle Laccourreye, Mora, Pérez Gonsalves || 17½ || 5 || 
|-
| 14 ||  || Porath, Kraidman, Domnitz, Aloni, Guthi, Stepak || 17½ || 3 || 
|}

{| class="wikitable
|+ Final B
! # !!Country !! Players !! Points !! MP
|-
| 15 ||  || Uhlmann, Malich, Liebert, Fuchs, Golz, Möhring || 38½ || 
|-
| 16 ||  || Ståhlberg, Johansson, Sköld, Nilsson, Jansson, Fridh || 32 || 
|-
| 17 ||  || Andersen, Kølvig, Brinck-Claussen, Blom, Jakobsen, From || 31½ || 
|-
| 18 ||  || Kottnauer, Clarke, Haygarth, Littlewood, Hindle, Franklin || 31 || 
|-
| 19 ||  || Quiñones, Súmar Casis, Ascencios J., Rodríguez Vargas, Pinzón Sánchez, Miranda M. || 27½ || 15
|-
| 20 ||  || Dückstein, Beni, Prameshuber, Gragger, Stöckl, Winiwarter || 27½ || 14
|-
| 21 ||  || Jiménez, José Pérez, Rodríguez Gonzáles, Ortega, García, Cobo || 26 || 
|-
| 22 ||  || Johannessen, Zwaig, Hoen, Vinje-Gulbrandsen, Svedenborg, Kristiansen || 25½ || 14
|-
| 23 ||  || Myagmarsuren, Üitümen, Purevzhav, Tsagan T., Chalkhasuren, Namzhil || 25½ || 13
|-
| 24 ||  || Letelier, Hausman, Vergara, Jauregui, Godoy Bugueño, Espinoza || 24 || 
|-
| 25 ||  || Naranja, Balinas, Borja, Campomanes, Badilles, De Castro || 22½ || 
|-
| 26 ||  || Yépez, Moritz, Garcés, Ottati, Yepez Obando, Cevallos || 18 || 
|-
| 27 ||  || Silva, Saguier, Cantero, Gonzáles, Levy, Vely || 17½ || 
|-
| 28 ||  || Fairhurst, Aitken, Fallone, Bonner, Baxter R, Thomson || 17 || 
|}

{| class="wikitable"
|+ Final C
! # !! Country !! Players !! Points !! MP
|-
| 29 ||  || Thorsteinsson, Björnsson, Torvaldsson, Kristinsson, Sólmundarson, Kristjánsson || 37½ || 
|-
| 30 ||  || Kupper, Blau, Bhend, Walther, Roth, Castagna || 36½ || 
|-
| 31 ||  || Cuéllar, Minaya Molano, Cuartas, Tejada H., Fernández, Rodríguez || 35 || 24
|-
| 32 ||  || Kanko, Westerinen, Fred, Niemelä, Rantanen, Ketonen || 35 || 19
|-
| 33 ||  || Tapasztó, Villarroel, Caro, Schorr, Hernández, Boucchechter || 30½ || 
|-
| 34 ||  || Boutteville, Mazzoni, Thiellement, Bergraser, Noradounguian, Zinser || 29½ || 
|-
| 35 ||  || Paidousis, Kokkoris, Vizantiadis, Hadziotis, Papapostolou, Ornithopoulos || 27½ || 
|-
| 36 ||  || Mashian, Kahyai, Jelveh, Safvat, Farboud, Zafaranian || 23½ || 
|-
| 37 ||  || Ali, Aaron, Sakhalkar, Madon, Shukla, Shekhar G. || 22 || 
|-
| 38 ||  || Colón Romero M., Reissmann, Martínez Buitrago, Sitiriche, Sacarello, Cintrón || 21½ || 
|-
| 39 ||  || Süer, Külür, Haralambof, Tebi, Nutku, Bilyap || 20½ || 
|-
| 40 ||  || Aldrete, Camarena, Reza Delón, Delgado, Guerrero, Flores || 20 || 
|-
| 41 ||  || Keogh, Reilly, Murphy P., O'Hare, Cassidy, De Loughrey || 13 || 
|-
| 42 ||  || Casa, Weiss, Rometti, Deslauriers J., Kostjoerin || 12 || 
|}

{| class="wikitable"
|+ Final D
! # !! Country !! Players !! Points
|-
| 43 ||  || Koshnitsky, Hanks, Geus, Fuller, Hay, Viner || 22½
|-
| 44 ||  || Dreyer, Kirby, Rubinsztein, Friedgood, Wolpert, Isaacson || 18
|-
| 45 ||  || Ramírez, Salazar, Zegada, Carvajal || 15½
|-
| 46 ||  || Olivera, del Monte, Cabral, Infantozzi, Kalkstein, Weizman || 14½
|-
| 47 ||  || Ribeiro, Durão, Rocha, Santos, Vinagre, Cordovil || 14
|-
| 48 ||  || Conrady, Philippe, Schneider, Wantz, Schneider, Thill || 12
|-
| 49 ||  || Peña, Yabra, Guerrero, Sánchez, Castrillón || 10½
|-
| 50 ||  || Kleopas, Papadopoulos, Hadjikypris, Ioannidis, Lantsias, Zappas || 5
|}

Final «A»

Final «B»

Final «C»

Final «D»

Individual medals

 Board 1:  Wolfgang Uhlmann 15 / 18 = 83.3%
 Board 2:  Tudev Ujtumen 13½ / 17 = 79.4%
 Board 3:  Vassily Smyslov 11 / 13 = 84.6%
 Board 4:  Paul Keres (10/12),  Helmut Pfleger (12½/15), and  David Friedgood (10/12) = 83.3%
 1st reserve:  Leonid Stein 10 / 13 = 76.9%
 2nd reserve:  Milan Matulović and  Günther Möhring 11 / 13 = 84.6%

At the other end of the spectrum, Milton Ioannidis of Cyprus lost all of his 4 games, giving him a total score at the Olympiads of 0 / 24 = 0.0%.

References

16th Chess Olympiad: Tel Aviv 1964 OlimpBase

16
Olympiad 16
Chess Olympiad 16
Chess Olympiad 16
Chess Olympiad 16
Chess Olympiad 16
Chess Olympiad 16
1960s in Tel Aviv